Kristine Harutyunyan (born 18 May 1991 in Leninakan, Armenian SSR) is an Armenian javelin thrower. She competed at the 2012 Summer Olympics in the women's javelin throw. Harutyunyan placed 38th with a mark of 47.65 metres. Her best throw is 49.12 meters, achieved on 21 April 2012 in Adler, Russia. This throw is the Armenian record.

References

External links
Sports-Reference.com

1991 births
Living people
Sportspeople from Gyumri
Armenian javelin throwers
Olympic athletes of Armenia
Athletes (track and field) at the 2012 Summer Olympics
Armenian female athletes
Female javelin throwers